Askolds Hermanovskis (19 September 1912 – 18 August 1967) was a Latvian alpine skier. He competed in the men's combined event at the 1936 Winter Olympics.

References

1912 births
1967 deaths
Latvian male alpine skiers
Olympic alpine skiers of Latvia
Alpine skiers at the 1936 Winter Olympics
Sportspeople from Riga
20th-century Latvian people